Håvard Sakariassen (born 28 August 1976) is a Norwegian retired football striker he played for FK Bodø/Glimt. He previously played for Aalesunds FK, Bryne FK and Moss FK. He announced his retirement in August 2011.

Career statistics

References

External links
Guardian's Stats Centre

1976 births
Living people
Norwegian footballers
FK Bodø/Glimt players
Moss FK players
Bryne FK players
Aalesunds FK players
Eliteserien players
Sportspeople from Bodø

Association football forwards